Thaís Cristina da Silva Ferreira (born 1 May 1996), simply known as Thaís, is a Brazilian professional footballer who plays as a centre back for Série A1 club SE Palmeiras and the Brazil women's national team.

Club career
Thaís has played for Valinhos FC, Guarani FC, AA Ponte Preta, Grêmio Osasco Audax EC and Palmeiras in Brazil.

International career
Thaís made her senior debut for Brazil on 17 September 2021 as a 63rd minute substitution in a 3–1 friendly home win over Argentina.

References

External links

1993 births
Living people
Sportspeople from Campinas
Footballers from São Paulo (state)
Brazilian women's footballers
Women's association football central defenders
Guarani FC players
Associação Atlética Ponte Preta players
Grêmio Osasco Audax Esporte Clube players
Sociedade Esportiva Palmeiras (women) players
Brazil women's international footballers